Perry Colson McGriff, Jr. (June 29, 1937 – February 2, 2017) was an American politician, retired insurance agent, and former All-American college football and baseball player. McGriff was a member of the Florida House of Representatives, Mayor of Gainesville and Democratic nominee for a seat in the Florida Senate.

Early life and education  
McGriff was born in Arcadia, Florida, in 1937. He attended the University of Florida in Gainesville, where he was a member of Phi Delta Theta Fraternity (Florida Alpha Chapter) and Florida Blue Key leadership honorary. McGriff played college football for coach Bob Woodruff's Florida Gators football team in 1958 and 1959, and led the Gators with fourteen receptions for 360 receiving yards and was an honorable mention All-American in 1959. McGriff was also an outfielder for coach Dave Fuller's Florida Gators baseball team from 1958 to 1960, and was honored as a first-team All-Southeastern Conference (SEC) selection in 1959 and 1960, a first-team All-American in 1959, and a second-team All-American in 1960. He received his bachelor's degree in physical education from Florida in 1960, and was inducted into the University of Florida Athletic Hall of Fame as a "Gator Great" in 1969.

Political career 
McGriff, a Democrat, served as the 22nd district Representative in the Florida House of Representatives from 2000 to 2002.  He also served as an Alachua County, Florida, commissioner, as a Gainesville, Florida city commissioner and as Gainesville mayor. In 2010, he was the unsuccessful Democratic Party nominee for Florida's 14th senate district, losing to the incumbent Republican Steve Oelrich, 46 to 54 percent.

McGriff lived in Gainesville with his family. He died on February 2, 2017, at the age of 79.

See also 

 1959 College Baseball All-America Team
 Florida Gators football, 1950–59
 List of Phi Delta Theta members
 List of University of Florida alumni
 List of University of Florida Athletic Hall of Fame members

References

Bibliography 
Golenbock, Peter, Go Gators!  An Oral History of Florida's Pursuit of Gridiron Glory, Legends Publishing, LLC, St. Petersburg, Florida (2002).  .
Hairston, Jack, Tales from the Gator Swamp: A Collection of the Greatest Gator Stories Ever Told, Sports Publishing, LLC, Champaign, Illinois (2002).  .
McEwen, Tom, The Gators: A Story of Florida Football, The Strode Publishers, Huntsville, Alabama (1974).  .

External links 
  Representative Perry C. McGriff, Jr. – Official website of Florida House of Representatives.
 

1937 births
2017 deaths
All-American college baseball players
Florida Gators baseball players
Florida Gators football players
Mayors of Gainesville, Florida
Democratic Party members of the Florida House of Representatives
Florida city council members
County commissioners in Florida
Baseball players from Gainesville, Florida
People from Arcadia, Florida
Pan American Games medalists in baseball
Pan American Games bronze medalists for the United States
Baseball players at the 1959 Pan American Games
American athlete-politicians
Medalists at the 1959 Pan American Games
Players of American football from Gainesville, Florida
21st-century American politicians
Candidates in the 2010 United States elections
Sarasota Sun Sox players